USS O-4 (SS-65) was one of 16 O-class submarines built for the United States Navy during World War I.

Description
The O-class submarines were designed to meet a Navy requirement for coastal defense boats. They displaced  on the surface and  submerged. The O-class submarines had a crew of 29 officers and enlisted men.

For surface running, the boats were powered by two  diesel engines, each driving one propeller shaft. When submerged each propeller was driven by a  electric motor. They could reach  on the surface and  underwater.

The boats were armed with four 18-inch (450 mm)  torpedo tubes in the bow. They carried four reloads, for a total of eight torpedoes. The O-class submarines were also armed with a single 3"/50 caliber deck gun.

Construction and career
O-4 was laid down on 4 December 1916 by the Fore River Shipbuilding Company in Quincy, Massachusetts. She was launched on 20 October 1917, and commissioned on 29 May 1918 with Lieutenant Robert H. English (1888–1943), in command. O-4 operated out of Philadelphia, Pennsylvania, during World War I and patrolled the U.S. Atlantic coast from Cape Cod to Key West, Florida. 
 
Although O-4 received six hits from the steamer, she suffered no major damage. In November, she joined the 20-submarine contingent that departed Newport, Rhode Island, on 3 November for European waters, however, hostilities ceased before the boats had reached the Azores.

O-4 then sailed to New London, Connecticut, to train students at the Submarine School there. Reclassified to a second line submarine on 26 July 1924, and reverting to a first liner on 6 June 1928, she trained Submarine School students at New London until 1931, with the exception of a brief tour at Coco Solo. O-4 decommissioned on 3 June 1931.

The approach of World War II saw the recall of O-4 to active service. She recommissioned on 29 January 1941 and trained students at the Submarine School until war's end. After the war, she steamed to Portsmouth, New Hampshire, to decommission there on 20 September 1945. She was struck from the Naval Vessel Register on 11 October 1945, and scrapped on 1 February 1946.

Length of service
(Although O-4 was fourth boat numerically in the O class, she was the first commissioned.)

Awards
World War I Victory Medal
American Defense Service Medal
American Campaign Medal
World War II Victory Medal

Notes

References

External links
 

United States O-class submarines
World War I submarines of the United States
World War II submarines of the United States
Ships built in Quincy, Massachusetts
1917 ships